Kiunga may mean:

Places
Kiunga, Kenya
Kiunga Marine National Reserve
Kiunga, Papua New Guinea
Kiunga Rural LLG, Papua New Guinea
Kiunga Urban LLG, Papua New Guinea

Other uses
Kiunga (fish), a genus of blue-eyes from Papua New Guinea